Podšpilje  is a village in Croatia on the island of Vis. It is connected by the D117 highway.

Populated places in Split-Dalmatia County
Vis (island)